The digital divide in South Korea refers to inequalities between individuals, households, and other groups of different demographic and socioeconomic levels in South Korea in access to information and communication technologies ("ICTs") and in the knowledge and skills needed to effectively use the information gained from connecting.

The digital divide in South Korea is mainly caused by the unevenness of economic, regional, physical, or social opportunities, leading to marginalized persons not receiving the benefits that technology can bring. The lack of adaptation to the informatization of social services, such as administration and welfare, results in limited opportunities for basic daily life and social participation. South Korea's information gap was initially due to economic reasons and the difference in the initial cost for using the Internet or PC, but recently there has been a gap between the users of the information according to the degree of utilization of information. As the information society rapidly developed, the distribution of the Internet quickly accelerated in Korea, dividing people into two groups, people who are well adapted to the changes and those who are more familiar with the previous media. Although the percentage of local population with internet access is high in Korea, the average rate of internet usage is 99.9% for the young and 64.3% for the elderly.

Drawbacks of digital divide in Korea 

However, the nature of information and knowledge, through commercialization process in capitalism, could make a greater problem than supposition. So, information and knowledge is different from previous product( shoes, clothes, food so on) in that information and knowledge's cyclic process from creating and application to extinction is most fast. Also, those alteration in quantity and quality is unpredictable. From the nature of information and knowledge, those could make enormous social inequality (ex. class, state, sex, education, region etc.)  Furthermore, a global effect feature, one of the information and knowledge's nature, can deepen global inequality and further sharpen the 2080 society, called Pareto's law.

Reasons and correlating variables

Distribution of hardware 
The most basic reason is the distribution of hardware. The most basic hardware in the information era is a computer, which creates an information gap between those who have difficulties buying a computer and those who do not. According to the '2016 Information Gap Index and Survey' in South Korea, which conducted by the Ministry of Information and Communication (MIC) on 6,300 people nationwide, while only 53.2% of the underprivileged people have personal computer, the average proportion of whole people are nearly 83%. Computer penetration rates are affected by many correlating variables such as region, education, and income and these variables can issue a complex impact. To overcome this difference, OLPC (One Laptop per child) is developing and also distributing $100 computer. In addition, a project for the free use of the internet such as the fund router project is in progress, but it is not widely available in Korea. As 'ubiquitous' becomes more and more popular, the distribution of small hardware is expected to grow even more and the digital divide is expected to deepen further.

Education 
Education is the most relevant part of income in Korea. Children of lower income earners have fewer educational opportunities than higher incom earners. For this reason, the children of the low educated are more likely to be a low educated students than those of highly educated people, and this phenomenon leads to a vicious cycle of social inequality. Because the information era is built on capitalism, this vicious circle is likely to lead to current society as well. Education is an important reason of digital divide. Without education on information society, it leads to poverty of information which causes to the economic discrimination. Most of all, considering the characteristics of knowledge which is explosively expanding, if education cannot keep up with the pace of the informational change, it can cause education gap to be more severe. In order to solve this problem, continuous education is much more required rather than short term education.

See also 
 Digital divide by country
 Digital Opportunity Index
 Knowledge divide
 Mercedes divide

References 

South Korea
South Korea